Herd is a 2016 Serbian comedy film directed by Nikola Kojo.

Cast 
 Nikola Kojo - Kolja
 Vesna Trivalić - Vida
 Zoran Cvijanović - Cveja
 Nataša Ninković - Mila
 Nikola Đuričko - Baki
  - Trajko
  - Goša
 Branislav Trifunović - Lawyer actor
 Lako Nikolić - Laki
 Nikola Vujović - Bailiff actor
 Goran Radaković - Milan
 Petar Strugar - Sava
 Nebojša Ilić - Bailiff
 Vojin Ćetković - Neša

References

External links 

2016 comedy films
Serbian comedy films
Films set in Serbia
Films set in Belgrade
Films shot in Belgrade
Films shot in Serbia